James Vincent Ganly (September 13, 1878 – September 7, 1923) was a U.S. Representative from New York. Born in Manhattan, New York City, Ganly attended the public schools and Packard Business College. He engaged in the oil, real estate, and automobile businesses.

Politics
He was a member of the New York State Assembly (New York Co., 24th D.) in 1907. He was the first county clerk of Bronx County 1914–1918. Ganly was elected as a Democrat to the Sixty-sixth Congress, defeating Benjamin L. Fairchild and serving from (March 4, 1919 - March 3, 1921). He was an unsuccessful candidate for reelection in 1920 to the Sixty-seventh Congress, losing to Fairchild.

Last years and death
Ganly was elected to the Sixty-eighth Congress and served from March 4, 1923, until his death in an automobile accident in New York City on September 7, 1923, before the convening of Congress. He was interred in St. Raymond's Cemetery, The Bronx, New York. He was again succeeded in Congress by Fairchild.

See also
List of United States Congress members who died in office (1900–49)

References

External links
 
 U.S. Government Printing Office, James V. Ganly, Late a Representative from New York at HathiTrust, 1925

1878 births
1923 deaths
Politicians from Manhattan
Democratic Party members of the New York State Assembly
Politicians from New York City
Road incident deaths in New York City
Democratic Party members of the United States House of Representatives from New York (state)
Burials at Saint Raymond's Cemetery (Bronx)